Elachypteryx erebenna is a moth in the family Crambidae. It was described by Turner in 1908. It is found in Australia.

References

Moths described in 1908
Musotiminae